Vernon is a city in the Okanagan region of the Southern Interior of British Columbia, Canada. Named after Forbes George Vernon, a former MLA of British Columbia who helped establish the Coldstream Ranch in nearby Coldstream, the City of Vernon was incorporated on December 30, 1892. The City of Vernon has a population of 40,000 (2013), while its metropolitan region, Greater Vernon, has a population of 58,584 as of the Canada 2011 Census. With this population, Vernon is the largest city in the North Okanagan Regional District. A resident of Vernon is called a "Vernonite".

History
The site of the city was discovered by the Okanagan people, a tribe of the Interior Salish people, who initially named the community Nintle Moos Chin, meaning "jumping over place where the creek narrows". This name refers to a section of the Swan Lake that passes through Downtown Vernon, the community's central business district. Some of these were part of the Okanagan Indian Band, a First Nations government part of the Okanagan Nation Alliance. This was followed by Priest's Valley, which serves as an Indigenous reserve, and its present name, in honour of Forbes George Vernon, a pioneer member part of the Legislative Assembly of British Columbia for Yale. The Okanagan people settled around the city's two lakes, Okanagan Lake and Swan Lake, obtaining seasonal sources of food. In that same decade, a section of a road near Fort Kamloops became its first road. Pleasant Valley Road, north of that street, was also historically developed.

In 1811, fur traders began travelling around the area. After one of these, David Stuart, began working with the Pacific Fur Company, which was bought out by the North West Company; Luc Girouard became the first white settler. However, the North West Company was forced to merge with the Hudson's Bay Company in 1821. Fur traders decided to camp in Vernon, which started to develop in 1863, following a gold discovery at the Cherry Creek, Monashee Mountains, Mission Creek and the east side of Okanagan Lake. After the development began, numerous ranches were constructed. Centreville, the community's original central business district, was formed in 1885. That same year, a post office, hotel, general store, and school house was constructed. A Hudson's Bay Company store was established in 1887, in a rough wooden structure. Historically a major economic hub destination in the Okanagan, Vernon was home to many cattle ranches and fruit orchard areas, attracting British families.

Vernon's growth accelerated beginning in 1891, after the Canadian Pacific Railway was opened in the Okanagan and Shuswap regions of the British Columbia Interior, connecting in Sicamous, a town in the Shuswap area; services by this railway were offered to Vernon by 1891, in addition to its neighbourhood of Okanagan Landing. Shortly after, the sternwheeler S.S. Aberdeen was launched by the Canadian Pacific Railway for use on Okanagan Lake in 1893 connecting Vernon to Penticton at the south end of Okanagan Lake, and points between. Fruit trees were planted in Vernon, which first grew by the early 1890s, while water supplies were shipped to the community by canal in 1906 for use at local orchard or farm areas. In 1908, the Okanagan Mounted Rifles military program was formed in it, thus bringing a number of people to the area during World War I and World War II for lessons.

Vernon was incorporated as a city on December 30, 1892, with a city hall formed in 1903 for the governing body, which included a fire hall and a public reading space. The following year, it was declared the largest municipality in the Okanagan and first of which to contain a bank and telephone. As population expanded, more services were made available at Vernon, while its city centre switched from Coldstream Road to 30th Avenue. A school and Vernon Jubilee Hospital were public services made available in 1909. Despite a growth drop during World War I, citizens voted to open a new high school, sports stadium, and, later, a shopping mall, Village Green Centre, and library, in the city.

Transportation

Three provincial highways connect Vernon: Highway 97 which connects north–south (south to Kelowna, north to Kamloops); Highway 97A which begins in Vernon, and goes north to Armstrong and Enderby; and Highway 6 which ends in Vernon running east–west to Lumby. In recent years, each of these highways has undergone major renovations, including a new $22-million interchange system and four lane expansion at the Highway 97 and Highway 6 junction.

The City of Vernon, in conjunction with the District of Coldstream and the North Okanagan Regional District, operates Vernon Regional Transit through BC Transit. This transit system is responsible for all local full-service and handyDART public bus transportation. eBUs, a sister brand for the luxury transportation company Red Arrow, also serves Vernon for out-of-town destinations from their downtown bus terminal.

Vernon is served by the Vernon Regional Airport (IATA: YVE, ICAO: CYVK) in the Okanagan Landing area. The airport has no scheduled air service, and is primarily used by civilian aircraft. The Greater Vernon area is also served by Kelowna International Airport, located approximately 40 kilometres (about a 30 to 40 minute drive) south on Hwy 97.  Numerous airlines provide scheduled passenger and cargo services to points throughout British Columbia and Alberta, and areas beyond such as Toronto and Seattle.

Climate
Vernon has a humid continental climate (Koppen: Dfb) with warm, sometimes hot summers and cold winters with highs around freezing, though mild by Canadian standards. Precipitation is well-distributed year-round.

Demographics

In 2016, the median age was 48.4, higher than the national median age of 41.2. 25.5% of residents were age 65 or older. The median income before tax was $31,455. The median value of a dwelling was $349,932.

Ethnicity 
According to the 2021 census, 84.7% of Vernon residents are white, 8.0% are visible minorities, and 7.3% are Indigenous. The largest visible minority groups are South Asian (2.4%), Filipino (1.1%), Chinese (1.0%), and Japanese (0.8%). 

Note: Totals greater than 100% due to multiple origin responses.

Language 
The 2016 census reported that 87.7% of residents claim English as their mother tongue. Other common first languages are German (2.5%), French (1.4%), Punjabi (1.0%), and Russian, Ukrainian and Dutch (0.7% each).

Religion 
According to the 2021 census, religious groups in Vernon included:
Irreligion (23,755 persons or 55.1%)
Christianity (17,585 persons or 40.8%)
Islam (395 persons or 0.9%)
Sikhism (335 persons or 0.8%)
Hinduism (230 persons or 0.5%)
Buddhism (210 persons or 0.5%)
Judaism (90 persons or 0.2%)
Indigenous Spirituality (25 persons or 0.1%)

51.2% of residents were Christian as of 2011. The largest denominations were other Christian (16.9%), Catholic (12.4%), United Church (7.2%), Anglican (5.6%), and Lutheran and Baptist (2.6% each). 45.5% of residents held no religious affiliation. All other religions combined make up 3.3% of the population.

Education
Vernon is served by School District 22 Vernon, a school district that includes 14 elementary schools and five high schools.  The high schools are: Vernon Secondary School, Kalamalka High School, Clarence Fulton High School,  W.L. Seaton Secondary, and Charles Bloom Secondary.  Vernon Secondary School (VSS) is in the neighbourhood of East Hill. This building was renovated in the early 21st century to give the students a new and better learning environment.  Kalamalka Secondary  School, otherwise known as Kal, is in the neighbouring municipality of Coldstream which is near Kalamalka Lake. It is also below Middleton Mountain, a prominent landmark in Coldstream.  Fulton Secondary  School is near the airport in South Vernon.  Seaton High School, also known as Seaton, is located directly off 27th Street which merges into Highway 97. Charles Bloom Secondary is in the town of Lumby, which is about 20 minutes East of Vernon on Highway 6.  Competitions are common among the schools, with all of them taking part in annual grad pranks as well as healthy sports competitions. Vernon is home to few independent schools such as the Vernon Christian School, which has both an elementary (preschool-grade 6) and secondary campus with a middle school (grades 7-9) and high school (grades 10-12).
For post-secondary education, Vernon is home to Okanagan College, a multi-campus full degree granting college. Many summer courses and yearly courses are offered there.  Other smaller community and specialty colleges exist within Vernon.

Arts and culture
Each winter, Vernon plays host to the Vernon Winter Carnival. First held in 1961, it is now Western Canada's largest and North America's second largest Winter Carnival.

Sunshine festival is an annual event held in the Downtown core of Vernon. This event features live music, artisan booths, community program booths, food trucks, kids entertainment and much, much more.

Vernon is also home to the state-of-the-art Vernon and District Performing Arts Center. The society presents three series of entertainment including dance, theatre, and child oriented.  The performing arts centre also hosts hundreds of touring musical acts, local talent and community based events.

The city is also home to the 60 year old Powerhouse Theatre, which is housed in a former power station. The theatrical society of Powerhouse Theatre operates on a seasonal basis and is largely reliant on the coordinated efforts by passionate volunteers.

Vernon's Towne Cinema is the home of The Vernon Film Society and is a classic example of a 1930s Art Deco style theatre.  Built in 1929–30, the Towne Cinema began its life as The National Ball Room, presenting live entertainment on stage, hosting banquets and stage plays.  It was the main venue in Vernon for entertaining the troops during the Second World War and was heavily involved in selling war bonds and the collection of aluminum from its customers for the war effort.  Children could bring an old aluminum pot or pan and receive a ticket for a free movie, the aluminum going towards the construction of war planes and other military materials so necessary for the achievement of victory over the Nazi regime of Adolf Hitler.

The Vernon Community Arts Centre (VCAC) is located in Polson Park.  This community centre is a studio-based facility and is operated by the Arts Council of the North Okanagan.  The VCAC offers year-round programming for youth and adults such as art classes and workshops, an artist in residence program and independent study sessions.

Every Summer in June, Vernon hosts the largest craft show in western Canada, called Creative Chaos.  Artisans from across western Canada gather to sell their original handmade goods and services: jewellery, chocolates and candies, unique clothing, and other household items and/or decorations. A food fair and entertainment are also a feature of this craft fair. The fair usually lasts three days and many of the citizens of Vernon partake.

Vernon displays a variety of public art from murals to sculptures and mosaics. A collection of 28 heritage murals was created under the direction of lead artist Michelle Loughery.  The mural project is in a continual state of growth, with new pieces of art being added at regular intervals.  One of the most notable murals is a depiction of Sveva Caetani, daughter of Italian noble Leone Caetani. She was an Italian immigrant who survived captivity by her mother to become a famed artist and local art instructor.

In 2016, Canada's first inclusive memorial sculpture was installed on the grounds of Vernon Secondary School.

Sports and recreation

Vernon is known for its lakes and beaches in the summer, and skiing and hockey in the winter. It is therefore a year-round tourist destination and weekend getaway for people from Vancouver and Calgary. During the summer Vernon hosts a large slo-pitch tournament (Funtastic).

The Vernon area is home to several golf courses. Among these is the prestigious Predator Ridge Resort, a 36-hole golf resort and community. This resort is one of only two public golf courses in Western Canada to have been ranked by Score Magazine as one of the country's top 25 golf courses over the last 8 years.  Predator Ridge Resort also hosted the Skins Game twice - first in 2000 featuring Fred Couples, Sergio García, Phil Mickelson, and Mike Weir, then in 2008 featuring Mike Weir, Fred Couples, Greg Norman, Colin Montgomerie and Camilo Villegas.

One of the most popular winter sports in Vernon is skiing. With two major ski locations nearby located in Regional District of North Okanagan Electoral Area C, each winter locals and tourists alike flock to Silver Star Mountain Resort and Sovereign Lake Nordic Club. Known as one of the top ski resorts in North America, Silver Star also has a large cross-country skiing area which hosted a 1991 FIS Cross-Country World Cup event. As another world-class ski area, Sovereign Lake is the region's premier cross-country skiing location with over 50 kilometers of skiing terrain. This Nordic Club gained worldwide exposure as the host of a 2005 FIS Cross-Country World Cup event.

Curling also has a strong following in Vernon, with local curlers being found at the Vernon Curling Club. In past years, the city has hosted several major national curling events, including the 1979 Canadian Senior Women's Curling Championship, the 1992 Canadian Junior Curling Championships, and the 2004 Canadian Senior Curling Championships. Its first international event, the 2008 Ford World Women's Curling Championship was held at the Vernon Multiplex.

Another popular sport in Vernon is tennis, with many courts in picturesque locations. The Vernon Tennis Association (VTA) was started in October 2008 to bring together tennis players of all skill levels within the Vernon area and to offer both competitive and social programs that are not being offered currently to players. Presently the VTA operates programs 15 hours per week in "partnership" with Greater Vernon Parks, Recreation and Culture.

A more recent sport with growing popularity is pickleball. The Vernon Pickleball Association was incorporated in 2014, and currently has more than 500 members. It recently spearheaded a campaign to construct a roof over its pickleball complex of 12 courts, which will facilitate year-round playing when it opens early 2021.

Kalamalka Beach (Kal Beach) is the most popular of many unique beaches in and around Vernon. A large pier built by a local service club is used for sunbathing and jumping. On summer evenings the beach is used extensively for beach volleyball. Kin Beach and Paddle Wheel Park Beach on Okanagan Lake are also among the twenty or so larger beaches in Vernon.

Vernon has several areas for mountain biking including Ellison Provincial Parc, Kal Lake Park, Sovereign Lake Provincial Park  Predator Ridge and Silver Star ski hill.

Cougar Canyon is near Vernon, with both a popular rock climbing site and an ecological preserve. Another place for cliff jumpers and campers is Ellison Provincial Park, located about 15–20 minutes out of South Vernon.

The city is home to the Atlantis Waterslides.

Vernon has also seen success in junior hockey.  The Vernon Vipers (former the Vernon Lakers) are one of the most decorated junior teams in Canadian history having won the Royal Bank Cup (formerly the Centennial Cup) six times, with four of those wins in the 1990s. They won while hosting the tournament in 1990, repeated in 1991, again in 1996, in 1999 and most recently won back-to-back championships in 2009 and 2010; giving arguably the most dominant performance of any franchise in a single decade since the introduction of the Centennial Cup in 1971. To date, the Vernon Vipers have won 4 Royal Bank Cups, 2 Centennial Cups, 4 Abbott Cups, 5 Doyle Cups, 8 Mowat Cups and 9 League Titles.

The Vernon Tigers Junior B Lacrosse Club was established in 2000, coinciding with the inception of the Thompson Okanagan Junior Lacrosse League. Since that time, they have won three league titles and two provincial silver medals.

Governance

In 2019 Vernon city council decided to install free-standing toilets, which can be "used by all community members", with specific design features to prevent it being used inappropriately.

Council had originally considered purchasing a pair of "Portland loos", for $275,000. That design that had been installed in dozens of cities, but, due to the long waiting list, Vernon decided to commission a similar facility from local suppliers.

The local design was installed on time, and at a lower cost than that projected for the Portland Loo. However, it needed a bit of work, as it did not function on opening day.  Like the Portland Loo, the toilet designed for Vernon is built from stainless steel and is painted with special paint designed to counter graffiti.  Like the Portland Loo there is no washbasin inside, only a toilet, and a dispenser for waterless hand cleanser.  Slats allow police enough visual access to confirm there is only one occupant.

Requests for new toilets were first brought to council by the Activate Safety Task Force, in 2018.  Initially Vernon planned to leave the facility open 24 hours a day, as is done with almost every city that has installed a Portland Loo, but, in the end, Council decided the facility will only be open from 7am to 9pm.

If the new facility proves satisfactory, toilets like it will replace the public toilets near the city's bus station.

Notable people
 Andrew Allen, singer-songwriter
 Alice Barrett Parke, diarist and pioneer
 Eric Brewer, Former ice hockey player NHL 
 Leone Caetani, scholar of Islam, father of Sveva Caetani, spent the last years of his life in Vernon.
 Raquel Cole, country music singer, musician, and songwriter 
 John Denison, a Canadian ice road engineer who operated in the Northwest Territories in the 1950s-1970s.
 Josh Dueck Won both silver and gold medals at the Paralympic Games in Sochi, Russia, as well as a silver medal at the 2010 games in Vancouver.
 Andrew Ebbett, ice hockey player for the Pittsburgh Penguins
 Lykele Faber, Dutch secret agent during World War II
 Tracy Garneau, Ultramarathon runner
 Sonja Gaudet Paralympic Curler, three-time gold medalist, Sonja Gaudet is the world's most decorated wheelchair curler.
 Eric Godard, professional hockey player for the Pittsburgh Penguins
 James Green, professional football player for the Toronto Argonauts
 Kevin Hill is a Canadian snowboarder.
 Aaron Hoffman (stage name SonReal) is a hip hop and alternative artist.
 Krista and Tatiana Hogan, craniopagus conjoined twins
 Ken Holland, general manager of the Edmonton Oilers
 Ryan Holmes, CEO of HootSuite
 Larry Kwong, first Chinese Canadian ice hockey player in the NHL
 Frederick McCall, WW1 Air Ace.  McCall Field was the original name of the Calgary International Airport
 Vasek Pospisil, tennis player, Wimbledon 2014 men's doubles champion
 Daniel Powter, singer-songwriter of US Billboard #1 hit song from 2005 Bad Day
 TJ Schiller, professional skier
 Jerred Smithson, professional hockey player for the Florida Panthers
 Raymond Wladichuk, professional football player for the Hamilton Tiger-Cats

Photo gallery

Sister cities
Vernon has "sister city" agreements with the following cities:
 Anandpur Sahib, India
 Frankenburg am Hausruck, Austria
 Modesto, United States
 Saint-Lambert, Canada
 Tavullia, Italy
 Tome, Japan

Freedom of the City
The following People and Military Units have received the Freedom of the City of Vernon.

Individuals
 Kenneth Mark Holland: 26 October 2021.

Military Units
 Vernon Army Cadet Summer Training Centre: 4 August 1979.
 British Columbia Dragoons: 10 May 2008.

See also
B.X. Falls
Flag of Vernon, British Columbia

Notes

References

External links

 
Cities in British Columbia
Populated places established in 1892
Populated places in the Okanagan Country
Populated places in the Regional District of North Okanagan
Populated places on Okanagan Lake
Internment camps in Canada